Omut is a rural locality (a village) in Gorodetskoye Rural Settlement, Kichmengsko-Gorodetsky District, Vologda Oblast, Russia. The population was 38 as of 2002.

Geography 
Omut is located 60 km northwest of Kichmengsky Gorodok (the district's administrative centre) by road. Podol is the nearest rural locality.

References 

Rural localities in Kichmengsko-Gorodetsky District